Florence Muringi Wambugu (born 23 August 1953) is a Kenyan plant pathologist and virologist. She is known for her advocacy of using biotechnology to increase food production in Africa.

Education
She attended the University of Nairobi, Kenya, where she received her Bachelor of Science in botany and zoology. She obtained her Master of Science in botanical pathology from North Dakota State University, United States in 1984; and her PhD from the University of Bath, England in 1991.

She was also awarded an Honorary Degree (Doctor of Science) from the University of Bath in 2009.

Professional career 
Wambugu is the founder, director and the chief executive officer of Africa Harvest Biotech Foundation International (AHBFI) since 1994. AHBFI is a nonprofit foundation with offices in Nairobi, Kenya, Johannesburg, South Africa, and Washington, D.C. Previously, she founded, established and worked as Africa Region Director, ISAAA – Afri-center, in Nairobi. From 1978 to 1991, she worked as a senior research officer (pathologist) and coordinator of plant biotechnology research at the Kenya Agricultural Research Institute (KARI), Kenya. Thereafter (1991–1994), she was a post-doctoral fellow with Monsanto Company.

She has made significant contributions to the research, development and improvement of maize, pyrethrum, banana, sweet potato and forestry production in Kenya. She has published over 100 articles and co-authored various papers.

Previously, she served on several board of directors including the Private Sector Committee of the CGIAR, the United Nations Millennium Development goals Hunger task force; she also was a member of the executive committee of Forum for Agricultural Research in Africa (FARA); the DuPont Company Biotech Advisory Panel, USA; the International Plant Genetic Resources Institute (IPGRI, now called Bioversity International), and the African Biotechnology Stakeholders Forum (ABSF). 
Currently, she is serving as a Council Member of the Japan ; a steering committee member of the European Action on Global Life Sciences (EAGLES); and a Science Board member of the Bill and Melinda Gates Foundation Grand Challenge in Global Health.

GM Sweet Potato 
Florence Wambugu was involved in a project to develop a genetically modified (GM) sweet potato. In February 2004, the science magazine, New Scientist, reported that the project had failed.

Awards 
Florence Wambugu has been the recipient of numerous awards.

 IITA's (International Institute of Tropical Agriculture, Nigeria) Award (1981)
 KARI's Crop Science Award for Outstanding Scientist of the Year (1989)
 International Potato Center's (CIP) Regional Research Award/Grant (1989)
 Farmers Support Award, Pyrethrum Marketing Board of Kenya (1990)
 Recognised as an exemplary PhD candidate, Virology Division of Horticultural Research International in England and KARI (1991)
 Monsanto Company Outstanding Performance Award (1992, 1993)
 First Place Medal Winner, Global Development Network Awards, KARI (2000)
 World Bank Global Development Network Award, for the successful introduction of tissue-culture banana in Kenya (2000)
 Woman of the Year by Eve Magazine (2000)
 Yara Prize, for her significant contribution to the fight against hunger and poverty in Africa (2008)
 Honorary Degree (Doctor of Science), University of Bath (2009)

Personal life
Florence Wambugu has three children.

References

External links 
 Profile in Africa Harvest – Biotech Foundation International
 Biography at answers.com
 Biography at encyclopedia.com
 
 
 Why Africa needs agricultural biotech – Nature 1999

1953 births
Living people
Kenyan virologists
Women virologists
Alumni of the University of Bath
21st-century Kenyan women scientists
21st-century Kenyan scientists
University of Nairobi alumni
Women zoologists
20th-century Kenyan women scientists
20th-century Kenyan scientists
Kenyan phytopathologists
North Dakota State University alumni